Onayena Constituency is an electoral constituency in the Oshikoto Region of Namibia. The district capital is the settlement of Onayena. 

The constituency's population has grown significantly over recent years, dominated by the Ovambo language speaking people and a small group of San people. It had 15,684 inhabitants in 2004 and 8,550 registered voters .

Economy and infrastructure
The main economic activities in the constituency are agriculture and cattle rearing. Omahangu is the principal crop in Onayena, while cattle, goats and donkeys are the farming animals in the area. The constituency has important cultural and historical links. Onayena has a settlement prominent for investment opportunities and has a lot of large virgin land available housing and business investment.

History
The Ondonga kings Shikongo shaKalulu and Nehale Mpingana lived and are buried here. The village of Omandongo where the first Finnish missionaries arrived in 1870, including Nakambale Martti Rautanen, is situated in Onayena.

Politics
Onayena constituency is traditionally a stronghold of the South West Africa People's Organization (SWAPO) party. 

In the 2015 local and regional elections Mateus Nelumbu Kamati, a former SWAPO coordinator, won uncontested and became councillor after no opposition party nominated a candidate. Councillor Kamati was re-elected in the 2020 regional election. He received 2,987 votes, well ahead of Hileni Shinyamba of the Independent Patriots for Change (IPC), a party formed in August 2020, who obtained 651 votes.

People from Onayena Constituency
Onayena is the hometown of many prominent people in Namibia, such as kwaito musician and producer The Dogg, and home to the first vice-president of Namibia, Nickey Iyambo.

Schools in Onayena Constituency

Nehale Senior Secondary School
Joseph Simaneka Asino Secondary School
Uuyoka Combined School
Oniihwa Combined School
Iikokola Combined School
Matheus Nashandi Combined School
Matheus Namwiha Primary School
Ekaha Primary School
Ambunda Primary School
Onayena Primary School
Onuuya Primary School
Lucas Primary School
Lano Primary School (private school)
Ondumetana Primary School
Oniiwe Primary School
Nakambale Primary School
Okakonda Primary School
Elombe Combined School

Churches in Onayena Constituency
 Onayena ELCIN Church
 Omulondo ELCIN Church
 Elombe ELCIN Church

Villages in Onayena Constituency

 Oniiwe 
 Ompugulu
 Oniimwandi
 Omandongo
 Uuyoka
 Onambeke
 Uukete
 Ethindi
 Enkolo
 Iikokola
 Oniihwa
 Okakwiyu
 Omadhiya
 Okambogo
 Okakololo Village
 Iihongo Village
 Uushinga
 Onamutene
 Onathinge-South
 Shimbobela
 Okaliveva
 Elombe

See also
 Administrative divisions of Namibia

References

External links
 http://www.raison.com.na/school_maps/oshikoto_school_map.pdf
 http://www.onayenajss.org/index.php

Constituencies of Oshikoto Region
States and territories established in 1992
1992 establishments in Namibia